Wonder Boyz (Hangul: 원더보이즈) was a South Korean Hip hop group formed by Ent102 in 2012. They debuted on October 16, 2012, with Open The Door.

Discography

Extended plays

Singles

References

K-pop music groups
Musical groups established in 2012
South Korean boy bands
South Korean dance music groups
South Korean pop music groups
Musical groups from Seoul
2012 establishments in South Korea
Musical groups disestablished in 2015
2015 disestablishments in South Korea